Raymond Victor Bilney (born 2 November 1945) is an Australian former cyclist. He competed in the individual road race at the 1964 Summer Olympics. He was the Australian senior road champion for three years running, 1964 to 1966.

References

External links
 

1945 births
Living people
Australian male cyclists
Olympic cyclists of Australia
Cyclists at the 1964 Summer Olympics
Place of birth missing (living people)
Commonwealth Games medallists in cycling
Commonwealth Games silver medallists for Australia
Cyclists at the 1970 British Commonwealth Games
20th-century Australian people
21st-century Australian people
Medallists at the 1970 British Commonwealth Games